Pieski  is a village in the administrative district of Gmina Międzyrzecz, within Międzyrzecz County, Lubusz Voivodeship, in western Poland.

The village has a population of 245 (population in 2008).

Sports
 KS As Pieski – men's and women's football club (Polish league, level 7)

References

Pieski